Mr. Finchley Takes the Road is a 1940 comedy novel by the British writer Victor Canning.  It was the final part of a trilogy featuring the mild-mannered Edgar Finchley who had been introduced in the 1934 novel Mr. Finchley Discovers His England. First publication was by Hodder and Stoughton with an American edition by Carrick and Evans. It was included in the 1973 Uniform Edition by Heinemann, and has been reissued by Farrago Books in 2019. In 1990 it was adapted for radio by the BBC starring Richard Griffiths.

Synopsis
The newly married Mr. Finchley takes a fancy to a horse-drawn caravan and buys it. He travels around Kent while house hunting and enjoys a fresh series of adventures.

References

Bibliography
 Ehland, Christoph and Wächter, Cornelia. Middlebrow and Gender, 1890-1945. BRILL, 2016.
 Reilly, John M. Twentieth Century Crime & Mystery Writers. Springer, 2015.

External links 
 Full bibliography by John Higgins
 The Victor Canning Pages

1940 British novels
British comedy novels
Novels set in Kent
Novels by Victor Canning
Hodder & Stoughton books